An American war correspondent, William H. Graham was the aviation editor of the New York Journal of Commerce, and covered the Pacific airlift of the Korean War.

He drowned following the March 3, 1951 failed take-off of an Douglas Skyraider, from USS Princeton that left the pilot injured.

References

1951 deaths
American war correspondents
Journalists killed while covering the Korean War
Year of birth missing